Anthony S. Verrelli (born January 6, 1964) is an American carpenter, union leader and Democratic Party politician who represents the 15th Legislative District in the New Jersey General Assembly.

Early life 
Born in Trenton, he grew up in Lawrence Township where he attended Notre Dame High School. He became a carpenter and active union member, eventually becoming President of Carpenters Local Union 254. He has previously lived in Ewing Township and served on the township zoning board, in addition to other county-wide advisory boards. Currently a resident of Hopewell Township, Mercer County, New Jersey, Verrelli was elected to the Mercer County Board of Chosen Freeholders in 2016 succeeding long-time freeholder Anthony Carabelli and resigned from that position after being selected to fill the vacant seat in the Assembly.

New Jersey Assembly 
Previously a member of the Mercer County Board of Chosen Freeholders, Verrelli was sworn into office on August 5, 2018, to succeed Reed Gusciora, who left office after being sworn in to serve as Mayor of Trenton, New Jersey.

In 2020, he was one of the primary sponsors of Assembly Bill 4454 (now N.J.S.A. 18A:35-4.36a) which requires a curriculum on diversity and inclusion to be included in the school curriculum for students in kindergarten through twelfth grade.

Committees 
Committee assignments for the current session are:
State and Local Government, Chair
Community Development and Affairs, Vice-Chair
Labor, Vice-Chair
Special Committee on Infrastructure and Natural Resources

District 15 
Each of the 40 districts in the New Jersey Legislature has one representative in the New Jersey Senate and two members in the New Jersey General Assembly. The representatives from the 15th District for the 2022—23 Legislative Session are:
Senator Shirley Turner (D)
Assemblywoman Verlina Reynolds-Jackson (D)
Assemblyman Anthony Verrelli (D)

References

External links
Legislative webpage

1964 births
Living people
American carpenters
American trade union leaders
County commissioners in New Jersey
Democratic Party members of the New Jersey General Assembly
Notre Dame High School (New Jersey) alumni
People from Ewing Township, New Jersey
People from Hopewell Township, Mercer County, New Jersey
People from Lawrence Township, Mercer County, New Jersey
Politicians from Trenton, New Jersey
21st-century American politicians